The New South Wales Police Force strip search scandal refers to an ongoing policing scandal surrounding the routine and arbitrary use of strip searches by members of the New South Wales Police Force.

Particular concern has centred around the use of strip searches "in the field", the term used by NSW Police to describe the practice of conducting strip searches outside of a police station. Following the introduction of a controversial law in 2001, police in New South Wales were given the power to deploy specially trained drug detection dogs at large scale public events, licensed venues, and on selected routes across Sydney's public transport network. In 2006, a review published by the New South Wales Ombudsman found that there were significant issues relating to their use, including civil liberties concerns, false positives, and low rates of accuracy. The report noted that during a two-year period between February 2002 and February 2004, NSW Police had conducted 10,211 personal searches resulting from positive drug detection dog indications. Most of those searches had either been a pat down or a search of a person's belongings, however in several cases, officers had made the decision to proceed to a strip search. The Ombudsman noted that such incidents were rare at the time.

In late 2014, several stories were published alleging that NSW Police had begun routinely using indications from drug detection dogs as a justification for conducting strip searches. Since that time, the practice has been documented through various news reports and firsthand accounts published on social media. Particular controversy has surrounded the use of strip searches at large scale public events such as music festivals in New South Wales, where in the aftermath of a drug detection dog indication, patrons will typically be escorted to a fenced off compound inside the venue. Inside these compounds, NSW Police have allegedly employed the use of structures such as ticket booths, tents, makeshift partitions and police vans to conduct both strip searches and less invasive general searches. In some cases, it has been alleged that these structures did not offer adequate privacy to individuals being searched, leaving them potentially exposed to other attendees or officers outside. In cases where a strip search has been conducted, patrons have recalled being made to perform tasks such as lifting their breasts or genitals, bending over, spreading their buttocks, squatting and in some cases coughing while either partially or completely naked. Separate reports have also documented similar incidents taking place at train stations and licensed venues across New South Wales during drug detection dog operations as well.

Statistical data obtained from NSW Police shows that in the six-year period between 1 July 2014 and 30 June 2020, officers had conducted 27,835 strip searches "in the field". Of that number, 5,659 were recorded as having taken place in the aftermath of a positive drug detection dog indication, with the same figures revealing that an additional 63,302 general searches resulting from the use of drug detection dogs had also been carried out during this period. Data pertaining to specific events is limited, however at the Splendour in the Grass music festival in July 2018, it was revealed that over the course of two days, officers had carried out 512 personal searches, with 143 of those searches being strip searches. More than 90% of strip searches conducted at the event had resulted in no illicit substances being found.

In October 2018, the Law Enforcement Conduct Commission, the state's newly established police watchdog, launched a formal investigation into the use of strip searches by NSW Police, citing complaints from members of the public and wider community concerns surrounding the practice. A final report handed down in December 2020 noted that "a recurrent issue throughout the Inquiry was the failure of officers to comply with, or at least to properly account for their compliance with, the legal thresholds for conducting a strip search". The commission also noted that there had been a "significant increase" in the "number and proportion" of strip searches carried out following drug detection dog indications in the five years between 2014 and 2019. Figures published in the report showed a reduction in the number of strip searches conducted in the field during the first half of 2020, a change that was largely attributed to the cancellation of music festivals in New South Wales due to the COVID-19 Pandemic.

Background 
Drug policy in New South Wales was a contentious political issue throughout the 1990s. Findings handed down by the Wood Royal Commission into Police Corruption in 1997 noted that a significant amount of the corruption uncovered throughout the inquiry had been "connected to drug law enforcement". The commission had exposed "systematic and entrenched" corruption within the New South Wales Police Service (later changed to New South Wales Police in 2002 before being renamed the New South Wales Police Force in 2006) across a number of areas, uncovering cases of bribery, assault, evidence tampering and other misconduct, including instances where officers were found to have participated in the supply of drugs or had been involved with drug dealers. At the conclusion of the inquiry, adverse findings were made against 284 officers, seven of whom were later jailed. In his final report, Justice Wood expressed the opinion that a criminal approach to drug use in New South Wales had enabled police corruption, suggesting the formation of a national commission or summit to discuss alternative approaches, citing the need for a "meaningful strategy" to "address the problems of drug supply, use, and rehabilitation". In 1999, a week-long drug summit was convened at Parliament House by newly re-elected Premier Bob Carr.

In July 2000, an upper house inquiry was launched in response to the ongoing issue of drugs and organised crime in the Southwestern Sydney suburb of Cabramatta. In March 2001, the Premier announced a suite of new measures aimed at addressing the situation, including the deployment of additional police and a team of drug detection dogs to the area. As part of the security operation in place for the Sydney 2000 Olympic Games, the NSW Police Dog Unit had taken delivery of an additional 30 sniffer dogs, with many being repurposed as drug detection dogs at the conclusion of the event. By the time of the Premier's announcement in March, a group of 14 specially trained drug detection dogs had entered service with NSW Police for general duties policing, with aim of targeting "street-level drug dealing across Sydney entertainment areas and at music festivals".

Despite the absence of legislation governing their use, by early 2001, NSW Police had routinely begun deploying drug detection dogs at a variety of locations across the state, including clubs, licensed venues and public transport precincts. In one operation carried out in October, "more than 1000" nightclub patrons had been searched during coordinated raids involving an estimated 300 officers and nine drug detection dogs. These operations had drawn criticism from a number of community organisations and civil liberties groups, including the NSW Council for Civil Liberties, the AIDS Council of New South Wales and Redfern Legal Centre. In opposing their use, Redfern Legal Centre had assisted in the preparation of several test cases aimed at challenging the legality of drug detection dog operations in the state's courts. In one such case (Police v Darby), a man had been charged with possessing cannabis and methamphetamine after being stopped by a drug detection dog in February earlier that year. At a hearing in November, a Local Court Magistrate had dismissed the charges, ruling that the act of the dog "nuzzling" and "sniffing" the man had constituted an unlawful search.

Responding to the Court's decision in Darby, on 27 November, then Opposition Leader Kerry Chikarovski introduced a bill aimed at clarifying the powers available to police in relation to drug detection dogs. The proposed legislation was not supported by the government. On 6 December, newly appointed Police Minister Michael Costa introduced his own bill, similar to the one which had been put forward by the Opposition Leader. "The bill is aimed primarily at detecting and prosecuting persons committing offences relating to the supply of prohibited drugs and plants. ... It is clear that the activity envisaged is drug dealing" he said in relation to the proposed legislation. On his first day as Police Minister on 21 November, Costa had declared his support for the use of drug detection dogs in New South Wales, promising "to make lawful the use of drug sniffer dogs in random street searches if current legislation proved to be flawed". Despite opposition from some crossbench MPs, the bill passed with bipartisan support. The new legislation, the Police Powers (Drug Detection Dogs) Act 2001, would give NSW Police the power to deploy drug detection dogs at major public events, licensed venues and on selected routes across Sydney's public transport network.

2006 Ombudsman's Report (drug detection dogs) 

Conditional to the passage of the Police Powers (Drug Detection Dogs) Act 2001, then New South Wales Ombudsman Bruce Barbour was given the task of overseeing initial drug detection dog operations carried out under the legislation, with a report to be tabled to the Attorney General and Commissioner of Police at the conclusion of a two-year review period. In a final 400-page report handed down in June 2006, the Ombudsman had criticised the use of drug detection dogs in New South Wales, describing them as an "ineffective tool" for catching drug dealers and questioning whether the legislation governing their use should be "retained at all".

A key issue identified in the report were the relatively few instances where illicit drugs had been found in the aftermath of positive drug detection dog indications. Between February 2002 and February 2004, NSW Police had conducted 10,211 personal searches resulting from the use of the dogs. Of that number, 74% (7547) had resulted in no drugs being found, while in the 26% (2664) of cases where illicit substances had been recovered, 141 incidents (1.38%) had been recorded as involving a traffickable or "deemed supply" quantity of drugs (the amount required to necessitate a drug supply charge in New South Wales). On the basis of these findings, the Ombudsman had recommended that police guidelines be amended to remove suggestions that officers had a "reasonable suspicion to search a person based solely on a drug detection dog indication".

In addition to low detection rates, the report had also identified a number of other concerns relating to the use of drug detection dogs in New South Wales, including civil liberties infringements, negative public perception and complaints of humiliation and embarrassment from members of the public who had been wrongly searched by police. In December 2005, the standalone Police Powers (Drug Detection Dogs) Act 2001 was repealed, with the powers given to police under the legislation instead being incorporated into sections 145 through 150 of the Law Enforcement (Powers and Responsibilities) Act 2002. In 2012, NSW Police were given expanded powers allowing for the deployment of drug detection dogs at tattoo parlours, all public areas in Kings Cross and across the entirety of the Sydney Trains network.

2009 Ombudsman's report (Law Enforcement Powers and Responsibilities Act) 
Acting on recommendations made by the Wood Royal Commission in 1997, the Law Enforcement (Powers and Responsibilities) Act 2002 - commonly referred to as LEPRA, was passed by New South Wales Parliament as a means of consolidating police powers into a single piece of legislation. As part of this process, the New South Wales Ombudsman had been tasked with monitoring the use of certain functions under the act when it came into effect in December 2005.

Following a two-year review, a provisional report was released by then Ombudsman Bruce Barbour in 2007, with a final report being handed down in February 2009. In accordance with legislative provisions set out under LEPRA, the report had primarily focused on three key areas of policing – the establishment of crime scenes, notices to produce documents and safeguards relating to personal searches. In relation to personal searches, the report had made a total of 33 recommendations aimed at improving current police practices, including several pertaining to the use of strip searches. The report had called on Parliament to review the practice of officers asking individuals to squat, while also requesting that Section 32 of LEPRA be amended to better define the term "genital area" as it applied to the legislation.

2013 statutory review and changes to LEPRA 
In accordance with provisions set out under LEPRA, both the Attorney General and Minister for Police had been required to complete a statutory review of the legislation. Four years after the release of the Ombudsman's 2009 report, the findings of a joint review undertaken by the Attorney General's Department and Ministry for Police and Emergency Services were tabled to Parliament. The review served as the government's official response to the Ombudsman's 2009 recommendations and drew heavily on the findings of a second review undertaken by former shadow Attorney General Andrew Tink and former Police Minister Andrew Whelan. This second review had been commissioned by then Premier Barry O'Farrell in October 2013. Recommendations made by the Ombudsman that Parliament should consider defining the term 'genital area' for the purposes of a search and review the practice of officers asking persons to squat were "considered" by the government but were ultimately "not supported". The review did however support the removal of the existing categories of "frisk" and "ordinary" searches under LEPRA in favour of a simplified two-tiered system consisting of strip searches and what were later referred to as "general searches". An amended version of LEPRA was passed in June 2014.

Early incidents and first media reports 
Statistics published by the New South Wales Ombudsman in 2009 had revealed that in 2006 and 2007, NSW Police had carried out a combined total of 613 strip searches 'in the field', with the earliest available data pertaining to strip searches resulting from drug detection dog indications revealing that in 2009, 556 such searches were conducted, with an additional 2945 strip searches being carried over the next four years. Despite these figures, few of these incidents were publicly reported and media coverage of the issue was limited at the time. The first recorded mention of the practice had appeared in a post uploaded to Reddit in January 2010. In that instance, a commuter said he had been strip searched at Redfern Train Station after an indication from a drug detection dog, alleging that he had been taken into a public toilet with three officers and made to remove his clothes, lift his penis and spread his buttocks apart. No illicit substances were reportedly found by police.

In January 2012, the Hack program on Triple J had broadcast a half-hour special discussing the presence of drug detection dogs at music festivals in New South Wales and other Australian states. The program heard from a number of callers who had allegedly been strip searched in the aftermath of positive drug detection dog indications, though many had admitted to having small quantities of drugs in their possession at the time. The use of the dogs was also a contentious issue at the 2013 Gay and Lesbian Mardi Gras, which was overshadowed by allegations of police brutality. Dozens of complaints had been lodged with organisers in the weeks following the event, including some from revelers who had allegedly been subjected to unlawful strip searches. Speaking to news.com.au, a 53-year-old man said he was left feeling "humiliated" after being made to remove his pants and underwear at a Mardi Gras afterparty celebration at Sydney's Royal Botanic Garden. A civil suit launched by the 53-year-old had later been settled out of court for an undisclosed amount.

Several incidents from this period have also been discussed in later media reports. An article uploaded to music industry website HowlandEchoes in 2015 had featured an account from a performer who had allegedly been strip searched at the Parklife Music Festival in Sydney in 2011. The woman recalled that a drug detection dog had "decided to take an interest" in her bag, at which point she alleged, "a cop took me into a prison wagon and made me strip naked, squat... the whole nine-yards. I'd started crying in my show make-up, angry and humiliated that somehow I had no consent in this process. She tried to make small talk with me while my clothes were in a pile against the bars and I'm barefoot on the well-trodden muddy floor". No drugs were reportedly found and the woman said she was left feeling "shaken" after the experience.

Rising numbers and increased media coverage

In late 2014, several media outlets began publishing firsthand accounts from members of the public who had allegedly been strip searched by NSW Police. Speaking to Vice in September, one 23-year-old man said:"It happens at festivals all the time. They've got booths set up to strip search you. It's basically a known thing that where there's sniffer dogs, they'll be strip searches as well".Recalling an incident he had witnessed at a music festival, drug educator Paul Dillon, Director of Drug and Alcohol Training and Research Australia (DARTA) told Vice, "I can remember one girl who was totally traumatised by the experience" ... "She'd been strip searched and was mortified. The girl had no drugs on her, was not a drug user, but had been through a very traumatic experience".

Police figures published by the Sydney Morning Herald in December had revealed that the number of strip searches resulting from positive drug detection dog indications had increased 32% in New South Wales since 2009, rising from 556 to 735.

Launch of Sniff Off Facebook page 

In 2011, a campaign opposing the use of drug detection dogs was launched by former New South Wales Greens MP David Shoebridge in collaboration with the NSW Young Greens. As part of the campaign, a Facebook page was created in October 2014 allowing members of the public to report drug detection dog sightings in the community. The information is then shared with followers of the page. Speaking about the use of drug detection dogs in 2014, Shoebridge said, "Where have we got to in this state when police are routinely stripping people down, getting them to squat naked over a mirror and then staring up their backsides, on the basis of a drug dog indication that is wrong two thirds of the time?"

Changes to police oversight
In November 2015, then Police Minister Troy Grant announced proposed changes to the existing police oversight framework in New South Wales. The announcement came in response to the findings of a commissioned review carried out by former Shadow Attorney General Andrew Tink. Under the new arrangement, the state's three existing police oversight bodies - the Police Integrity Commission, the Police and Compliance Branch of the New South Wales Ombudsman's Office and the Inspector of the NSW Crime Commission - would be dissolved, instead being replaced by a single agency, which would be referred to as the Law Enforcement Conduct Commission (LECC).

In September 2016, acting New South Wales Ombudsman John McMillan warned that the new police watchdog would have "inferior" powers, noting that the LECC would be limited to investigating incidents involving "serious misconduct and serious maladministration" and would be operating with a reduced budget. Despite these concerns, legislation approving the formation of the LECC was passed by Parliament in November 2016, with the organisation formally commencing operations on 1 July 2017.

Doubling in the number of strip searches resulting from drug detection dog indications
Data obtained from NSW Police under Freedom of Information laws showed that the number of strip searches carried out following drug detection dog indications had more than doubled between 2016 and 2017, rising from 590 to 1,124. Responding to questions from former NSW Greens MP David Shoebridge at a Parliamentary Budget Estimates hearing in 2018, then Police Commissioner Mick Fuller denied suggestions that there had been any change in policy leading to the increased figures. The trend reflected a broader increase in the use of strip searches by NSW Police, with figures obtained in December 2018 revealing that the number of strip searches conducted by officers in the field had risen almost 47 percent in the four years between 2014–15 and 2017–18, rising from 3,735 to 5,483.

Venue ban policy
In the days leading up to a live performance by British electronic dance trio Above and Beyond at Sydney Showground in June 2018, NSW Police announced a controversial new policy which would see ticketholders denied entry to the event following a drug detection dog indication, even in cases where a person was not found to be in possession of any illicit substances.

Writing on Twitter, former Australian Border Force Commissioner Roman Quaedvlieg labelled the move "extraordinary". "Festival drugs are risky granted but a person can have minute drug traces from handling cash, infused into garment fabric etc," he said. "Using an 'indication', as they call it, to ban entry into a social event is too much". Shortly after the announcement was made, a crowdfunded attempt to secure an injunction was launched by the NSW Greens in the state's Supreme Court. The move was unsuccessful, with presiding Justice Michael Pembroke ruling that the court was unable to make decisions based on hypotheticals.

A similar policy had been enforced at two hardstyle dance events earlier in the year. Both events had also been held at Sydney Showground. At the Midnight Mafia music festival in May, 187 patrons were reportedly refused entry despite only 45 being found in possession of illicit drugs. Writing on social media, multiple attendees claimed they had been subjected to strip searches before having their tickets confiscated by police. Speaking to The Sydney Morning Herald in 2019, a 20-year-old woman recalled feeling "scared" and "completely helpless" after allegedly being made to strip naked in front of two female police officers inside a booth at the event. The woman had reportedly been the victim of a sexual assault and said that being strip searched was a "refresher" of the incident. It was alleged that police had ejected the woman from the venue despite no illicit drugs being found during the search.

It was also reported that NSW Police had denied entry to ticketholders at the "A State of Trance" music festival in April. Speaking to the ABC in June, promoter Richie McNeill had estimated that "about 40 people" were turned away from the event after being stopped by a drug detection dog. McNeill's company, Hardware Corp, was also responsible for organising the upcoming Above and Beyond performance at Sydney Showground that weekend. When asked about the proposed decision to deny entry to patrons, McNeill acknowledged that his company had given police approval for the plan. "We have to or there's no event basically" he said.

Despite opposition, NSW Police had proceeded with the planned operation at the Above and Beyond performance on 9 June. Reporters covering the event at Sydney Showground spoke to a number of patrons who had allegedly been strip searched by officers before being ejected from the event. One woman told SBS News she had been made to "strip and squat" after a positive indication from a drug detection dog, while another woman claimed she had been made to squat naked inside a booth after police had witnessed her handing a fifty-dollar note to her boyfriend. Neither woman was reportedly carrying any illicit drugs. In an unusual move, NSW Police did not issue a media release after the event, with former Greens MP David Shoebridge suggesting that an earlier backlash surrounding the decision to deny entry to patrons may have prompted the decision. Shoebridge told news.com.au that his office had been contacted by six attendees who were denied entry to Sydney Showground after being searched by police, alleging that each person had been stopped by a drug detection dog and that none were carrying any illicit substances. It remains unclear how many people were ejected from the venue during the operation.

Shortly after the event, photos were circulated on social media from an Above and Beyond attendee who claimed he had been issued a ban notice prohibiting entry to the Sydney Olympic Park precinct for 6 months. Speaking to the Hack Program on Triple J, the man said he had been stopped by a drug detection dog before being strip searched by officers. Responding to questions from news.com.au, a spokesperson for NSW Police rejected suggestions that the man had been banned from Sydney Olympic Park on the basis of the drug detection dog indication, instead citing "offensive behaviour" while also claiming that the man had tried to enter the event without a ticket. A Sniff Off volunteer who was present at the Above and Beyond performance contested those claims, instead suggesting that the notice had been issued after the man and his four friends had begun arguing with the officers who had conducted the search.

Despite controversy surrounding the practice, NSW Police had continued to issue ban notices to patrons at subsequent music festivals. The issue was discussed by the Law Enforcement Conduct Commission in its final report into the use of strip searches by NSW Police handed down in December 2020. The commission had been made aware of several cases where festivalgoers had been banned from Sydney Olympic Park after being strip searched by officers, despite no drugs being found during those searches. The bans had been issued under the Sydney Olympic Park Regulation, state legislation governing the powers given to the Sydney Olympic Park Authority.  Under the act, the Authority "may ban a person from entering any part of Sydney Olympic Park for any period (not exceeding 6 months) determined by the Authority if the person contravenes any provision of this Regulation". While the act entitled police to exercise the powers of the Authority, the commission had expressed concerns about the use of the legislation to issue bans to music festival patrons, suggesting it was unlikely that every person banned by police had breached provisions under the act.

In June 2020, the commission was advised that by NSW Police that officers would discontinue the practice of issuing ban notices to festival patrons attending events at Sydney Olympic Park, citing legal advice which had been received on the matter.

Attalla v State of NSW and release of internal police report

In May 2018, a civil court judgement was handed down in the case of a 53-year man who had been strip searched by police after being arrested in 2015. Steven Attalla had been sitting in front of a church in Darlinghurst in the early hours of 24 March when he was approached by three police officers. After claiming she suspected he was in possession of illicit drugs, one of the officers had informed the man that he was going to be searched. When the 53-year-old refused, he was arrested and transported to Kings Cross police station, where he was made to "strip to a naked state, lift his genitals and squat" in front of two male officers. The 53-year-old described the experience as "humiliating" and "outrageous". No drugs were found and he was subsequently issued a court attendance for hindering police. The charge was later dropped.

In handing down his ruling, presiding Justice Phillip Taylor found that the officers involved had acted with "an almost reckless indifference", describing the strip search as an "invasive power without the slightest justification" before awarding the man just over $112,000 in damages plus legal costs. The incident was later the subject of an investigation by the Law Enforcement Conduct Commission, who in May 2020 found that the officer who had ordered that the 53-year-old be strip searched had engaged in "serious misconduct".  The Court's ruling was mentioned in a leaked internal report published by NSW Police in November 2018. The report, which had been prepared by the Force's Lessons Learned Unit, acknowledged that officers had routinely been failing to adhere to legal requirements when conducting strip searches, stating that "there is both a lack of compliance and a lack of consistent application when it comes to the exercise of police powers for the purposes of a strip-search". In a bid to remind officers of their legal obligations in relation to the practice, a number of training materials including video packages, "step-by-step instructional stickers" and "educational screen savers" had been prepared by the Lessons Learned Unit. The report also noted an increase in civil litigation which had been brought against NSW Police in relation to strip searches since 2013, describing it as an "organisational risk".

Hidden Festival incident

In a viral post uploaded to Facebook, a 19-year-old woman had recalled being left "humiliated and embarrassed" after allegedly being strip searched by police at the Hidden music festival at Sydney Olympic Park on 2 March 2019. The 19-year-old had reportedly been re-entering the event with a friend when she was approached by two police officers with drug detection dogs. "They just stopped me without any reason really I hadn't seen the dogs react or sit and they just told me that I had been detected and that I had follow them". After being taken to a police search area inside the venue, the 19-year-old said she had been taken into a booth with a female officer, who had then instructed her to remove her clothing. "She stood in front of me, asked to check my things, asked to check my shoes and then told me to take off my top and then take off my skirt and my underwear and then to squat and cough" she recalled while speaking to the Hack program on Triple J in August. No drugs were reportedly found and it was alleged that the door of the booth had been left open while the search was being conducted. "Not only did I see other people being searched, during my search the door was left half open and only blocked by the small female cop. I could easily see outside, which means that attendees and the male cops outside could have easily seen in as well".

It was alleged that police continued to question the 19-year-old after the search had taken place. After being detained for "over an hour", the woman was reportedly ejected from the event and issued a ban notice prohibiting entry to Sydney Olympic Park for 6 months, with officers allegedly citing intoxication as the reason for issuing the ban.

A complaint made to NSW Police by the woman's mother was later the subject of a wider internal investigation undertaken by officers from the Force's Professional Standards Command, which was overseen by the Law Enforcement Conduct Commission. In findings handed down in July 2020, police investigators found that there was "insufficient lawful basis" for the strip search conducted on the 19-year-old or the 6-month ban notice that was issued at the event. The report had recommended that "sustained" findings be made against two officers in relation to the ban notice. An article published by The Guardian in June earlier that year had revealed that one of those officers had since resigned, while another had been "counselled by a senior officer and referred for additional training". It was unclear if any disciplinary action had been taken in relation to the strip search, however the Commission did recommend that NSW Police consider issuing an apology to the woman.

University of New South Wales report
In August 2019, a report examining the use of strip searches by NSW Police was released by University of New South Wales Law Academics Vicki Sentas and Michael Grewcock. The report had been commissioned by Redfern Legal Centre as part of its ongoing "Safe and Sound" Campaign. Key findings highlighted by the authors included a significant increase in the use of strip searches by NSW Police, with the report noting "an almost twentyfold increase in less than 12 years", referring to police figures which showed that "strip searches were used 277 times in the 12 months to 30 November 2006 compared to 5483 in the 12 months to 30 June 2018". The use of drug detection dogs, particularly at major events such as music festivals, was identified as a driving factor behind the increase.

The authors also drew attention to the low number of criminal charges resulting from strip searches carried out by NSW Police. Figures for the 2017–18 financial year showed that during this period, 30% of strip searches conducted in the field had resulted in charges being laid. Of those charges, 82% related to drug possession, 16.5% related to drug supply and the remaining 1.5% related to weapons offences. The report made 12 recommendations aimed at improving current strip search practices, including changes to LEPRA to better define what constitutes a search, as well as calling for an end to what the authors described as "deeply humiliating" practices such as asking a person to bend over or squat.

Festival deaths inquest

In July 2019, the Coroners Court of New South Wales opened a joint inquest into the deaths of six music festival patrons who had died after consuming fatal quantities of MDMA at separate events between December 2017 and January 2019. The inquest had been established to examine the circumstances surrounding the deaths of 18-year-old Nathan Tran, 19-year-old Alex Ross-King, 22-year-old Joshua Tam, 19-year-old Callum Brosnan, 21-year-old Diana Nguyen and 23-year-old Joseph Pham. Overseeing the inquest was NSW Deputy State Coroner Harriet Grahame.

Initial public evidence hearings began on 8 July, with an additional set of hearings taking place in September later that year. Over the course of 16 days, the Court heard evidence from multiple witnesses, including police and medical professionals, as well as event staff and festival attendees. Key areas of focus throughout the inquest were drug education, policing strategies and the adequacy of resources and onsite medical services at each of the events.

One particular area of concern for the Court were the circumstances surrounding the death of 18-year-old Nathan Tran, who had died in hospital after consuming after a fatal dose of MDMA at the Knockout Circuz music festival in 2017. Tran had been seen behaving erratically before falling and hitting his head inside the venue and had reportedly become distressed and combative when event medical staff attempted to treat him. Multiple police and security personnel were required to restrain the 18-year-old before transporting him to a medical tent inside the venue. These events had been captured on CCTV.

One witness called to give evidence in the matter was a 28-year-old woman who was also attending the Knockout Circuz music festival that day. The woman, whose name was suppressed by the Court, had reportedly witnessed police and security personnel attempting to restrain Tran while he was on the ground. As she was being questioned, the woman was reportedly asked by Counsel Assisting the Coroner Peggy Dwyer if she still attended music festivals in New South Wales. When asked why she didn't, the witness became emotional as she recalled being strip searched by police at the Knockout Circuz music festival earlier that day. The 28-year-old had reportedly been stopped by a drug detection dog at the entrance of the event, at which point she was allegedly taken into a booth, which she described as a "metal room", where a female officer had instructed her to remove her clothes. The officer had reportedly threatened to make the search "nice and slow" if the woman failed to produce any drugs. It was also alleged that the officer had opened the door of the booth while the woman was still naked.

Speaking about the incident, the 28-year-old said that the experience made her feel "like a criminal", telling the Court that, "you're naked ... the way I was spoken to, [it was] like I'd done something wrong". The woman had also reportedly been strip searched by police at a separate event, with no drugs being found on either occasion. Responding to the 28-year old's comments, the coroner said that the police presence at a music festival she attended earlier in the year had also made her feel "nervous". Grahame had been attending the Show Your True Colours music festival at Sydney Olympic Park in June at the invitation of event organisers. "There was just lines and lines of police and dogs ... I was surprised how intense it was" she recalled.

At a Parliamentary Budget Estimates hearing in August, then NSW Police Commissioner Mick Fuller was asked about the allegations put forward by the 28-year-old. Responding to questions from former NSW Greens MP David Shoebridge, Fuller criticised woman's comments, suggesting it was a "disgrace" that he was being held to account on the testimony of a "secret witness". "By a lady who turns up, the counsel assisting police were given no warning, turns up, no name, no address, nothing to us? A secret witness. Why did they keep that person secret?" he said. "I think it's poor practice if this is going to be the way forward in coronials, that mystery witnesses turn up and sit behind a veil of anonymity and they're not held to account. It's a disgrace in a democracy". When the inquest resumed in September, Dwyer drew attention to the Commissioner's comments, telling the court that the woman's full name had been made available to all parties who were present at the hearing, including NSW Police. She went on to state that the Commissioner's barrister had questioned the woman. and had been provided with her "non-existent" criminal history, as well as an opportunity to conduct background checks. "She was giving evidence about the death of Nathan Tran and in giving her answers, she rather spontaneously revealed she didn't go to festivals anymore because of the strip search incident" Dwyer told the Court. "Unfortunately, the police commissioner misunderstood the circumstances of that evidence". It was later reported that the Commissioner had withdrawn his remarks.

Coroner's final report and recommendations 
A final report from the inquest was handed down by Deputy State Coroner Harriet Grahame on 8 November 2019. In addition to specific findings pertaining to the deaths of the deceased, the report had also put forward a broader series of recommendations aimed at improving safety at future music festivals held in New South Wales. In a controversial move, Grahame had called on the state government to establish a pill testing (also referred to as "drug checking") trial at upcoming music festivals, describing the practice as "an evidence-based harm reduction strategy that should be trialed as soon as possible in NSW". A leaked draft of the coroner's recommendations had been published by The Daily Telegraph in October, with the proposal to introduce pill testing generating significant public discussion around the issue. Responding to the leaked recommendations, then Premier Gladys Berejiklian said that the government had no plans to introduce pill testing, suggesting that it would send the "wrong message" and give people a "false sense of security".

In handing down her findings, Grahame was highly critical of the policing strategies employed at music festivals in New South Wales, singling out the use of drug detection dogs and strip searches by NSW Police. The coroner said she was "extremely concerned" about the use of drug detection dogs at music festivals, suggesting that their presence may exacerbate the potential for drug related harm and encourage risky behaviours such as "panic ingestion" or "preloading". The report noted that this may have been a factor in the deaths of 19-year-old Alex Ross-King and 22-year-old Joshua Tam, with the coroner recommending that "the model of policing at music festivals be changed to remove drug detection dogs".

Speaking about the use of strip searches, Grahame said that "the practice of searching young people for the possible offence of possession is of grave concern", suggesting that "given the number of times that searches occur when there is no emergency or risk of serious harm, one can only assume that many searches are conducted unlawfully". She referred to the testimony of a 28-year-old witness who had allegedly been strip searched while attending the Knockout Circuz music festival in 2017, describing the woman's evidence as "palpable and disturbing". Speaking at the inquest in September, a barrister appearing for NSW Police Commissioner Mick Fuller had unsuccessfully sought to prevent the coroner from examining the issue, arguing that it was an "impermissible area of exploration" and that there was "simply no foundation" to do so. "It's not a roving royal commission. Your Honour has to look at manner and cause and what is connected to each of the tragic deaths," he said. In handing down her findings, Grahame had also called on NSW Police to limit the use of strip searches at music festivals to case of suspected drug supply, recommending that they only be used in cases where "there are reasonable grounds to believe that the strip search is necessary to prevent an immediate risk to personal safety" and "no less invasive alternative is appropriate".

Class action

In May 2020, it was announced that law firm Slater and Gordon would be partnering with Redfern Legal Centre to investigate the possibility of bringing a class action against the New South Wales Police Force. The proposed class action would seek to deliver compensation to members of the public who had been unlawfully strip searched by NSW Police, with a specific focus on incidents which had taken place during or after 2014. Speaking at a launch event in Sydney, Senior Associate at Slater and Gordon Ebony Birchell said that there were "systemic problems" with the way strip searches were conducted in New South Wales. "Legally an unlawful police search is classified as an assault. People who have been assaulted have been wronged and have legal rights to redress. This class action aims to help those people" she said.
 
In November 2021, it was announced that the proposed class action would focus exclusively on strip searches which had taken place at the Splendour in the Grass music festival between 2016 and 2019. "The [NSW Police Watchdog] the Law Enforcement Conduct Commission has investigated strip searches at Splendour in the Grass already and they've made findings that show that police lack training and didn't understand the legal safeguards around strip searches," said Slater and Gordon's Ebonie Birchell. "This indicates to us that there have been widespread unlawful strip searches at Splendour in the Grass over the last few years". In a separate statement, Redfern Legal Centre's Alexis Goodstone suggested that incidents at Splendour in the Grass could serve as a "test case" for future legal cases "focusing on other locations or music festivals". Responding to questions about the announcement, a spokesperson for NSW Police said that "the test on whether a search was conducted lawfully is ultimately a matter for the courts. Police are required to suspect on reasonable grounds that the circumstances are serious and urgent when determining whether a strip search Is necessary. When making that determination police will consider all of the available information, including the risk of someone overdosing or dying".

Class action documents were filed in the Supreme Court of New South Wales in July 2022. Contrary to previous announcements, the class action will include any person who "attended a NSW music festival held since 22 July 2016" and was "strip-searched by NSW Police on the basis the police suspected you were in possession of drugs". In a statement of claim, lawyers argued that officers had subjected to festivalgoers to "unlawful acts" including assault, battery and false imprisonment. Head plaintiff for the class action is a female patron who had allegedly been strip searched at the Splendour in the Grass music festival in 2018. The woman, who was 27 at the time, had reportedly been stopped by a drug detection dog on her way into the event before being escorted to a search area where police had setup "a number of open makeshift cubicles" covered by a screen made from "tarpaulin-like material". It's alleged that she was taken into a cubicle where a female officer had ordered her to "lift her breasts and bend over, and to show the officer her genitals to prove that the only item inserted in her body was a tampon". It's also alleged that a male police officer had entered the cubicle where the woman was being searched while she was naked from the waist down. The woman described the experience as "degrading, scary and confusing", adding in a statement that "since then, every time I approach security to enter a festival or gig, I get scared and wonder if it’s going to happen to me all over again".

Statistical data

Questions regarding the accuracy of figures provided by NSW Police

Drug detection dog statistics 
In October 2019, then Police Minister David Elliot tabled figures to Parliament detailing the number of personal searches carried out by New South Wales Police following positive drug detection dog indications. The figures were tabled in response to questions from former NSW Greens MP David Shoebridge. The data showed that during the eight-year period between 1 July 2011 and 30 June 2019, NSW Police had conducted a total of 96,425 personal searches resulting from the use of drug detection dogs, with illicit substances being found in 24.3% of those searches.

The following month in November, Police Commissioner Mick Fuller was being asked about coronial inquest recommendations calling for an end to the use drug detection dogs at music festivals. Speaking on ABC radio, Fuller denied suggestions that the dogs were inaccurate. "The stats are clear that nearly in 40 per cent of cases, when the dog sits down we find drugs", he said. The Commissioner's comments were later the subject of a joint fact checking investigation conducted by ABC Fact Check in partnership with RMIT University, who later that year in December concluded that the claim was "overstated", citing the figures tabled to Parliament by Elliot in October. In January 2020, the ABC was provided with a new set of figures which showed that between 1 July 2011 and 30 June 2019, officers had instead conducted 100,047 personal searches resulting from positive drug detection dog indications, with prohibited drugs being found in 32.7% of those searches. "The drug dog statistics provided to the Minister's office in October last year were developed differently from the standard production of official NSWPF statistics and had not been peer reviewed. They are incorrect" said a police spokesperson in a statement provided to the ABC. The new figures were tabled to Parliament by the Police Minister in February. In an "unprecedented" move, ABC Fact Check announced that it was suspending its verdict on the Commissioner's claims, stating that it had "lost confidence" in the figures put forward by NSW Police. "We have asked the police for an explanation as to the difference between the two sets of figures and have not received a satisfactory or transparent response" they said. "In light of this, we have decided to suspend the verdict from the fact check".

Strip search statistics 
In a final report handed down in December 2020, the Law Enforcement Conduct Commission expressed concerns about the way strip search data was recorded by NSW Police. The Commission referred to police figures which showed that approximately one third of all strip searches conducted in the field between 2016–17 and 2019–20 had resulted in prohibited items being found. In a small number of cases, NSW Police had claimed that items such as bicycles, books, luggage and electrical appliances had been recovered during those searches. The Commission noted that these items had most likely been recovered before a strip search was conducted. In a submission to the LECC, NSW Police maintained that this was a "recording error" which accounted for "less than 1%" of incidents. Despite this, the Commission continued to express doubt about the police figures, concluding that they were "unreliable", with the report stating that "these anomalies raise a question about whether other items recorded as a 'find' resulting from a strip search were indeed found as a result of the strip search, or may have been found at some other point in the interaction between police and the individual".

Freedom of Information releases

Use of body cameras to record strip searches 
Internal police documents published in November 2018 had revealed that officers had been instructed to activate body cameras when conducting strip searches, though it remains unclear when and if these guidelines were followed. The "Body Worn Video Standard Operating Procedures'" or "BVW SOPs", stated that "police should capture a strip search on BWV where possible" and that any video should be "filmed from behind the person searched and at 45 degrees for the purpose of maintaining the person's privacy". The information was released in July 2019 in response to a Freedom of Information request submitted by Redfern Legal Centre.

Male and female strip search statistics 

Data obtained under Freedom of Information laws showed that in the three-year period between 1 July 2016 and 30 June 2019, 3919 women had been strip searched by NSW Police. Of that number, 122 were recorded as being girls under the age of 18. The data pertained to strip searches carried out 'in the field', i.e.at music festivals and other public locations. The information was published by Redfern Legal Centre in November 2019.

Responding to revelations that NSW Police had strip searched 122 underage girls, then Police Minister David Elliot was criticised after suggesting that he would have no problem with his own children being strip searched by police. "I've got young children and if I thought the police felt they were at risk of doing something wrong I'd want them strip-searched" he told reporters, before suggesting that most parents would be "pretty happy" if their children were strip searched and found with drugs. "I think you'd be pretty happy that they got found out". Figures published by Redfern Legal Centre the following month in December had revealed that during the same period, 11,304 men had been strip searched by NSW Police, including 344 boys under the age of 18. "I have found with young male clients who have been strip-searched there is a deep sense of humiliation and isolation, especially for those who have been asked to lift their testicles or made to squat," said Redfern Legal Centre's Samantha Lee in response to the figures.

Strip searches of minors 
Data published by Redfern Legal Centre revealed that 96 children under the age of 18 had been strip searched by NSW Police during the 2019–20 financial year, with more than 20% recorded as being of either Aboriginal or Torres Strait Islander descent. Speaking to The Guardian, Karly Warner, chief executive of the NSW Aboriginal Legal Service, said that the organisation was "incredibly disturbed" that police have "continued their strip searching of children". "Forcing a child to remove their clothes is deeply intrusive, disempowering and humiliating, and especially for Aboriginal people who have too often been targets of discrimination and over policing".

Legal settlements paid by New South Wales Police 
Figures obtained by former NSW Greens MP David Shoebridge and published by The Guardian in December 2020 had revealed that in the four-year period between 2016 and 2019, NSW Police had paid $113.5 million in compensation to settle civil misconduct cases, with the figure pertaining to more than 1000 cases of unlawful searches, illegal arrests, false imprisonment, assault and harassment. The specific details of most of those cases were unknown due to non-disclosure agreements. The figure of $113.5 million put forward by The Guardian was inconsistent with separate figures published in earlier reports. A separate article published by The Guardian earlier that year in February had instead claimed that since 2016, NSW Police had paid $238 million in legal compensation, while statistics published by The Daily Telegraph in October suggested that NSW police had paid $89.62 million to settle 968 civil cases during the same four-year period.

Responding to questions tabled to Parliament by Shoebridge in June 2019, a representative for then Police Minister David Elliot had said that the minister's office was unable to provide accurate figures in relation to police misconduct settlements. "Claims against the NSW Police for compensation resulting in settlements or judgements are often multi-faceted. It is for not  to separate out specific claims of police misconduct, civil liberties infringements and litigation arising in police operations from other types of compensation involving police officers, stations or personal injury claims against serving officers, or from other legal costs. Accurate information cannot therefore be provided in response to these questions".

Personal search quotas 
Freedom of Information documents obtained by former NSW Greens MP David Shoebridge in February 2020 revealed that NSW Police had set annual personal search quotas for officers to meet during the 2018 and 2019 financial years. Between 1 July 2018 and 30 June 2019, officers were set a target of 241,632 personal searches, with this figure being made up of a combination of strip searches and general searches. Official data showed that officers had narrowly fallen short of this target, with 238,923 personal searches being recorded during the 2019 financial year. A similar quota had been set by NSW Police for the 2018 financial year, with 238,813 personal searches being performed during this period, exceeding a set target of 223,272 searches.

A spokesperson for NSW Police had defended the use of quotas by the organisation, stating that "the NSW Police Force deploys various proactive strategies as part of an ongoing commitment to reducing crime and the fear of crime in the community." Speaking in opposition to the practice, former Director of Public Prosecutions Nicholas Cowdery warned that "if a target is set by superior officers, especially a target that will be relevant to performance assessment, natural human response will be to seek to meet the target by proper or improper means - by fudging, by exercising power where it is not properly warranted".

Creation of police database records after strip searches 
Freedom of Information documents obtained by Redfern Legal Centre in April 2021 revealed that between 2018 and 2020, the personal information of more than 5500 people who had been strip searched by officers had been recorded on the electronic police database (referred to as the Computerised Operational Policing System, or "COPS" database in New South Wales). None of those individuals had been found in possession of any illicit substances. The issue had earlier been raised at a Law Enforcement Conduct Commission hearing in October 2019. Responding to questions at the inquiry, a senior police officer acknowledged that a COPS entry which showed that a person had been stopped by a drug detection could potentially be used as a justification for a subsequent search, even in cases where an individual had not been found in possession of any illicit substances.

In a final report handed down in December 2020, the Commission had warned that "COPS records which note the reasons for a search as 'suspected illegal drug possession' create a negative inference about the person searched", suggesting that the information "may be used as a justification for a subsequent strip search". To minimise the risk of this happening, the Commission had recommended that in cases where no drugs had been found, officers should instead record personal details in handwritten notes, with "an appropriate cross reference to these handwritten notes being made in COPS". This measure was opposed by NSW Police, who argued that a person's name "should be recorded 'irrespective of whether anything is found' to facilitate subsequent searches for records of the search". In a submission to the report, Redfern Legal Centre had also warned that the commission's proposed changes may make it more difficult to obtain information for "a potential complaint or tort matter".

Similar concerns about police recording practices had also been raised by the New South Wales Ombudsman in 2006 in relation to searches carried out following drug detection dog indications. The Ombudsman had been made aware of the fact that after a search, some officers would routinely create "intelligence reports" or "information reports", on the COPS database, even in cases where no drugs were found. These reports would contain the personal information of persons who had been searched, with the Ombudsman warning that the practice could "prejudice future police dealings" for those individuals. At one briefing, a senior police officer had cautioned against the practice in cases where no drugs were located, noting that the information would routinely be reported as "drug-related intel" to officers in the field during radio checks. Amended guidelines implemented by NSW Police in 2001 had advised that searches following drug dog indications should instead be logged as "events" under a new "Person Search Category".

Issues relating to the use of drug detection dogs

Accuracy and low detection rates 
Statistics published in the Ombudsman's 2006 report had revealed that during a two-year period between February 2002 and February 2004, 26% of personal searches carried out following positive drug detection indications had resulted in illicit substances being found. The figure was consistent with data tabled to Parliament by then Police Minister David Elliot in October 2018, which showed that in the eight-year period between 2011–12 and 2018–19, NSW Police had conducted 96,425 personal searches resulting from the use of drug detection dogs, with illicit drugs being found in 24.3% of those searches. A controversial set of amended figures tabled to Parliament in February the following year instead claimed that officers had performed 100,047 personal searches during the same period, with 32.7% of those searches resulting in illicit drugs being found.

In a submission to the Ombudsman, NSW Police rejected criticisms about the effectiveness of the dogs, suggesting that their "accuracy is 70%". The report noted that NSW Police had reached this figure by taking into account "the 26% of searches where drugs were located, and incidents in which no drugs were located but the person made some admission of prior drug contact". The inclusion of "residual admissions" in drug detection dog statistics was also supported by the New South Wales Police Association, who argued that this metric "provides an accuracy rate of about 80%".The Ombudsman found that there were a number of issues with this approach, suggesting that while "some admissions may support the accuracy of drug detection dogs in picking up the scent of prohibited drugs, this should not be confused with the accuracy of the dogs detecting persons currently in possession of prohibited drugs, which is the purpose for their use". The Ombudsman also noted that it was left to the discretion of officers to decide "what constitutes an admission", finding that in some cases police had recorded "drug use that was weeks, months and sometimes more than a year prior to the indication by the drug detection dog".

Despite the Ombudsman's criticisms, NSW Police has continued to include 'residual admissions' in drug detection dog statistics. In a statement uploaded to the Force's website in December 2011, a police spokesperson argued that the dogs were "close to 100% accurate", suggesting that figures published by the Sydney Morning Herald reporting that "80 percent of sniffer dog searches" carried out that year had resulted in no drugs being found had been "misinterpreted". The spokesperson instead claimed that from a total of 17,198 searches, 27% had resulted in illicit substances being seized, while in a further 61% of cases "the person searched admitted to having had contact with drugs". The remaining 15% of cases where no drugs were found and no admission was made were attributed to "limited powers to conduct more intrusive searches and the person being untruthful about being in contact with drugs".

At a coronial inquest in 2019, NSW Police Superintendent Jason Weinstein gave evidence that drug detection dogs were "about 80% accurate". In handing down her findings, Deputy State Coroner Harriet Grahame took issue with this assessment. "What the raw material seems to show is that some people who were searched and who, after being specifically questioned by police, admitted recent contact with drugs, were not found to be in possession of drugs at the time of search. Police assert that the failure to recover drugs following an indication in these circumstances does not reflect a potential false positive, it somehow reflects the accuracy of the dog". The coroner instead referred to statistics for the 2018–19 financial year which showed that 23.8% of personal searches carried out following positive drug detection dog indications had resulted in illicit substances being found during that period, rising to 28.3% in cases of strip searches.

Civil liberties concerns 
The Ombudsman's 2006 report had acknowledged concerns from a number of parties about the use of drug detection dogs, citing submissions from politicians, government bodies and community and civil liberties organisations opposing their use. Writing to the Ombudsman, the NSW Council for Civil Liberties said, "It is the view of the [Council] that it is an invasion of privacy, harassment, and an illegal search to use dogs to sniff people chosen randomly". The Ombudsman's report had also noted public opposition in the form of comments published in letter to the editor sections of various Sydney newspapers. "Random public screening for possession of illegal drugs infringes on cherished civil liberties and is a waste of taxpayers' hard-earned money" wrote one person, while another said, "Nabbing the occasional pot smoker isn't fighting crime and to be sniffed at by a drug dog as one goes to work isn't a vote winner". Several complaints and direct submissions made to the Ombudsman had also expressed similar sentiments.

The Ombudsman's report also discussed the use of drug detection dogs as part of "high visibility policing" operations. Also referred to as 'saturation policing', the term is used to refer to "high profile police operations in which uniformed police conduct highly visible patrols in public places". The Ombudsman noted that some people had expressed concerns about the large number of officers often seen accompanying the dogs. In a submission to the report, one business owner wrote "I witnessed in excess of 20 uniformed police officers with a sniffer dog randomly approaching people on King Street … I have serious concerns about both the way in which police officers approached and searched citizens, and about the sheer number of officers … The scene on the street was one of confusion, intimidation and fear". Internal guidelines published in 2016 revealed that NSW Police recommended "each drug detection handler and dog be accompanied by a minimum of six (6) Police Officers", rising to 8 for "Transit / Railway Operations, Licensing and General Warrant Operations" and 10 for "Dance Party Operations".

As more reports of the practice have come to light, the use of drug detection dogs as a means of justifying strip searches has also been criticised. Internal police guidelines obtained by Redfern Legal Centre in 2019 warned that a positive indication from a drug detection dog did not provide "reasonable grounds" to strip search an individual, however Redfern Legal Centre's Samantha Lee suggested that these guidelines were routinely being ignored by officers. "Sniffer dogs are being used as reasonable grounds – their own documents clarify that this should not be happening," she said. "Redfern Legal Centre also lodged complaints for a number of clients who were taken from a drug-dog indication to a full-body strip search. We now know from the [operating procedures] that these searches may have been unlawful and completely unnecessary". The findings of an internal police review released in November 2018 acknowledged that there was a "lack of compliance" among officers in relation to strip search guidelines, reiterating that "a positive indicator from a drug detection dog must also be accompanied with other evidence obtained through observation, asking questions and using intelligence to meet the burden of proof required for 'reasonable grounds".

False positives 
In a number of cases, wrongful indications from drug detection dogs have been attributed to "false positives", instances where a dog may have been attracted to another scent which was mistaken for the odour of illicit drugs. The Ombudsman's 2006 report noted several instances where people who had been searched and subsequently found with no drugs on their person had suggested that food products or previous contact with animals may have been responsible. When asked about the issue, several handlers had rejected claims that this could have been the case. "If the dog reacts to someone and they say they have nothing to do with drugs they are lying – that's my personal opinion" said one, while another suggested that "I think each dog is different, because I know my dog. It might sniff someone that smells different, about a dog or a cat or something, but they don't indicate to me that's drugs".
The Ombudsman's report also noted several instances where drug detection dogs were recorded as having reacted to prescription medication, with 18 cases being mentioned on the police database. In a complaint made to the Ombudsman, one person recalled seeing "a man about 75-years-old [who] was sniffed out because of his prescription medicine. The man was a shaking mess". Speaking to the Sydney Morning Herald in 2020, an American man who was attending the Field Day music festival with his wife had claimed that she had been taken into a tent to be searched after a drug detection dog had reacted to an ADHD tablet she was carrying. In November 2021, two festivalgoers recalled being strip searched at the Splendour in the Grass music festival during separate incidents in 2016 and 2017 in the aftermath of drug detection dog indications. No illicit substances were reportedly found on either individual and both had suggested that insulin pens they were carrying may have caused the dogs to react.The issue of the dogs responding to "residual" drug odours was also discussed in the report, in reference to situations where a person may have previously used drugs or may have inadvertently come into contact with drug residue. The Ombudsman noted that in a number of instances, people had claimed they had recently been around friends or associates who had smoked cannabis in situations where no drugs had been found after a search. The report stipulated that "It may also be possible that the person came into contact with cannabis smoke without being aware of it, for example at a pub or party". In one incident, a complaint had been made after a man had allegedly been stopped by a drug detection dog twice within the space of a one-and-a-half-hour period. On the second occasion, he had voluntarily accompanied officers to a police station where he was reportedly "subjected to the humiliation of a strip search". When no drugs were found, it was alleged that one of the officers had suggested to the man that he "might have sat next to someone on a train or bus that had been smoking cannabis". In order to address the issue, police handlers had "attempted to change their feeding/reward practices to reduce the number of 'residual' indications". When asked by the Ombudsman, NSW Police maintained that the dogs were only supposed to be fed in situations where drugs were located, however the report noted that in practice "handlers usually fed their dog with every indication". Following the change, an observer from the Ombudsman's office recalled an interaction where, "[The handler] thinks her dog is not working well because she's been asked not to feed it when it indicates residuals. She thinks that this is confusing the dog because previously it was fed whenever it indicated".

The Ombudsman also noted concerns surrounding the use of drug detection dogs in crowded environments, citing the risk of "the risk of dogs wrongly indicating innocent patrons" in situations where large numbers of people may be in close proximity. Internal police guidelines obtained by Redfern Legal Centre in November 2019 had also warned that "overly crowded" venues may "limit the effectiveness of a drug dog".

Subsequent reports have also alleged that the dogs may be attracted to other odours. Speaking to the Sydney Morning Herald in 2011, a 22-year-old man recalled being stopped at Redfern Train Station after being found with dog treats in his pocket, while in another case, a man was reportedly searched at Central Station after a dog reacted to garden seeds in his bag. Several reports have also raised concerns about the possibility of drug detection dogs being attracted to menstruating women. The issue had also been raised in a complaint made to the Ombudsman in 2006.

Official responses from New South Wales Police 
In a statement provided to The Sydney Morning Herald in August 2019, a spokesperson for NSW Police had defended the use of strip searches by the organisation. "The NSW Police Force is responsible for enforcing legislation on drug and weapon possession and supply. Police officers do not enjoy carrying out strip searches, but it is a power that has been entrusted to us and searches reveal drugs and weapons", they said. "People who are trying to hide such items frequently secrete them in private places, and the only way to locate them is by a strip search, which may involve asking the person to squat". The statement also went on to defend the use of drug detection dogs as a means of justifying strip searches, arguing that they act as a "vital tool for detection of drugs, particularly at large scale events". Excerpts from the same statement have also been provided to other media outlets in response to separate inquiries.

Speaking to Richard Glover on ABC Radio that month, Police Commissioner Mick Fuller had rejected suggestions that strip searches were being overused in New South Wales. "We live in a society with eight million people Richard and it's hardly an epidemic" he said in response to statistics which showed that officers were performing more than 5000 strip searches a year. At a Parliamentary Budget Estimates hearing the following week, the Commissioner had reiterated his position. "[Strip search] is not a police power that's being overused; the only thing that's being overused are statistics that are wrong" he said, addressing data published by the University of New South Wales which showed that police strip searches had increased twentyfold since 2006.

2019 Daily Telegraph interview 

In the wake of recommendations made by Deputy State Coroner Grahame to limit the use of strip searches at music festivals, NSW Police Commissioner Mick Fuller launched a high-profile defence of the practice in an interview with Sydney's Daily Telegraph. Appearing in a front page exclusive published on 18 November, Fuller had warned that any attempt to curtail police search strip powers would lead to an increase in knife crime, citing Melbourne and London as examples. "You look at London. They decrease their person searches by 20,000 because of a government policy position and knife crime went through the roof," he said. The Commissioner went on to suggest that questioning "the legitimacy of policing" had "a negative impact on public safety" before insisting that young people "on the verge of criminality" should have "a little bit of fear" of police. "There will be a generation of kids that have no respect for authority and no respect for the community" he warned. "They need to have respect and a little bit of fear for law enforcement".

Responding to the comments,  Legal Academic Grewcock had suggested that the Commissioner's attempts to link strip searches and knife crime were "shrill and misleading". A report published by Grewcock in August 2019 in collaboration with fellow UNSW Academic Sentas had revealed that "less than 1%" of strip searches carried out in the four-year period between 2015–2016 and 2018–19 had been related to weapons possession offences, with the majority being carried out on suspicion that a person was in possession of illicit drugs. Speaking to Ray Hadley on 2GB later that day, the Commissioner reiterated his position. "The reality is I want there to be a small factor of fear so that young people aren't coming into town with bladed weapons". During an interview on ABC Radio the following morning, Fuller had attempted to clarify his remarks, insisting that his comments to the Daily Telegraph were not made in relation to strip searches but were instead aimed at addressing the use of police powers more broadly. "Knife crime is a huge problem, not just in Australia, but I'm not talking about strip searching people for drugs when I talk about fear," he said.

Writing in an opinion piece for The Sydney Morning Herald later that week, former Australian Federal Police Commissioner Mick Palmer labelled the comments "frightening". "As a long-time colleague of NSW police and a friend of several past commissioners, it is the first time I have ever heard the use of the word 'fear' as a basis for gaining respect and I am saddened by it" he said. "Police are given without-warrant powers to stop, search and detain sparingly and with good reason. Such powers, particularly those involving strip searching, are intrusive and intimidatory. They need to be used prudently and with clear evidence of reasonable cause".

Law Enforcement Conduct Commission investigations 

In October 2018 the Law Enforcement Conduct Commission, the State's newly established police watchdog, launched a formal investigation into the use of strip searches by NSW Police, citing complaints from members of the public and wider community concerns surrounding the practice. As part of a two-year inquiry, the Commission conducted a number of closed-door investigations relating to specific complaints, as well as two public hearings in relation to strip searches of minors at separate music festivals in 2018 and 2019. In a final report handed down in December 2020, the commission made a total of 25 recommendations aimed at improving existing protocols governing the use of strip searches by NSW Police.

List of Reported Incidents 

A list of publicly reported incidents involving strip searches conducted by the New South Wales Police Force.

See also 
 Royal Commission into the New South Wales Police Service
 Tasty nightclub raid
 Sydney lockout laws

Notes

References 

Strip search
Law enforcement in New South Wales
Police misconduct in Australia
History of New South Wales